Transcription factor E2F1 is a protein that in humans is encoded by the E2F1 gene.

Function 

The protein encoded by this gene is a member of the E2F family of transcription factors. The E2F family plays a crucial role in the control of cell cycle and action of tumor suppressor proteins and is also a target of the transforming proteins of small DNA tumor viruses. The E2F proteins contain several evolutionarily conserved domains found in most members of the family. These domains include a DNA binding domain, a dimerization domain which determines interaction with the differentiation regulated transcription factor proteins (DP), a transactivation domain enriched in acidic amino acids, and a tumor suppressor protein association domain which is embedded within the transactivation domain. This protein and another 2 members, E2F2 and E2F3, have an additional cyclin binding domain. This protein binds preferentially to retinoblastoma protein pRB in a cell-cycle dependent manner. It can mediate both cell proliferation and p53-dependent/independent apoptosis.

Transcription 

E2F1 promoter[PAX8] => E2F1

Interactions 

E2F1 has been shown to interact with:

 ARID3A, 
 CUL1, 
 Cyclin A1, 
 Cyclin A2, 
 GTF2H1, 
 MDM4, 
 NCOA6, 
 NDN, 
 NPDC1, 
 PURA, 
 PHB, 
 RB1, 
 RBL1, 
 SKP2, 
 SP1, 
 SP2, 
 SP3, 
 SP4, 
 TFDP1 
 TOPBP1, 
 TP53BP1, and
 UBC.

See also 
 E2F
 Retinoblastoma protein

References

Further reading

External links 
 
 

Transcription factors